Black Celebration is the fifth studio album by English electronic music band Depeche Mode, released on 17 March 1986 by Mute Records. The album further cemented the darkening sound created by Alan Wilder , which the band later used for their subsequent albums Music for the Masses, Violator, and Songs of Faith and Devotion.

Black Celebration reached number four on the UK Albums Chart, and has been cited as one of the most influential albums of the 1980s. To promote the album, the band embarked on the Black Celebration Tour. Three years after its release, Spin ranked it at number 15 on its "25 Greatest Albums of All Time" list.

Critical reception

Contemporaneous reviews for Black Celebration in the British press were mixed. Melody Makers Steve Sutherland lambasted the album and wrote that Depeche Mode came off as "pussycats desperate to appear perverted as an escape from the superficiality of teen stardom" and Sounds published a similarly scathing review. While criticizing chief songwriter Martin Gore's "adolescent fragments of despair", Sean O'Hagan of NME nonetheless praised Black Celebrations "perfectly constructed jigsaw melodies" and concluded, "When the songs address topics other than the composer's state of mind – as on the evocative exploration of loneliness that is 'World Full of Nothing' – Depeche Mode sound like a lot more than just a high tech, low-life melodrama." Betty Page of Record Mirror felt that the band should be admired for their "refusal to follow anything but their own fashion" and "unswerving ability to come up with great, fresh melodies."

Black Celebration has since been reappraised in retrospective reviews. In 2007, Rob Sheffield of Rolling Stone referred to the album as an "instant classic for the band's fans" that at the time of its release had seemingly been "utterly ignored by everybody else."

Trent Reznor of Nine Inch Nails cited Black Celebration, and its subsequent tour, as an influence and said it helped inspire him to write the album Pretty Hate Machine (1989).

Re-release
In 2007, Black Celebration was re-released with a bonus DVD. It was released on 20 March 2007 in the United States, on 26 March in the United Kingdom and on 2 April in the rest of Europe, as a part of the third wave of reissues (along with Construction Time Again). The first CD was remastered and (except in the United States) released as a CD/SACD hybrid. The bonus DVD includes the album's B-sides in addition to the singles and B-sides for "Shake the Disease" and "It's Called a Heart", two singles released in the interim between Some Great Reward and Black Celebration. The reissue also includes several live versions of some of the songs from Black Celebration. The album is released as originally intended and ends with "New Dress" (not "Black Day" or "But Not Tonight").

As with the other reissues, the accompanying DVD includes a documentary film. The film's title, The Songs Aren't Good Enough, There Aren't Any Singles and It'll Never Get Played on the Radio, is a quote from the film in which Martin Gore paraphrases Daniel Miller's reaction to the album's early demos. The documentary includes much detail about the making of the album, its singles and the ensuing tour. Other highlights include the band meeting the Cure and behind-the-scenes footage of several of the music videos.

The remastered album was released on vinyl on 2 April 2007 in Europe and on 11 September 2007 in the United States.

Track listing

2007 Collectors Edition (CD + DVD)

Personnel
Credits adapted from the liner notes of Black Celebration.

Depeche Mode
 Alan Wilder
 Andrew Fletcher
 David Gahan
 Martin Gore

Technical
 Depeche Mode – production
 Gareth Jones – production
 Daniel Miller – production
 Richard Sullivan – engineering assistance
 Peter Schmidt – engineering assistance
 Tim Young – mastering
 Dave Allen – recording on "Fly on the Windscreen – Final"
 Phil Tennant – recording assistance on "Fly on the Windscreen – Final"

Artwork
 Martyn Atkins – design
 David A. Jones – design
 Mark Higenbottam – design
 Brian Griffin – photography
 Stuart Graham – photography assistance

Charts

Weekly charts

Year-end charts

Certifications

References

External links
 
 Album information from the official Depeche Mode website
 Official remaster info

1986 albums
Albums produced by Daniel Miller (music producer)
Albums produced by Gareth Jones (music producer)
Depeche Mode albums
Mute Records albums
Sire Records albums
Virgin Records albums